Pancham is an Indian TV series aired on Zee TV channel, based on the life of a young teenage boy, Harpaul Rana, who wants to set the 'world' right without 'preaching'. The series premiered on 30 August 2004, and aired every Monday - Thursday at 1pm IST. The series ended on 20 May 2005.

Cast
 Namit Das as Pancham
 Priyanka as Rajshree
 Rohini Hattangadi as Pancham's grandmother
 Gufi Paintal as Kishore
 Nazneen Patel as Meera
 Yatin Karyekar as Kamlesh
 Smita Malhotra as Priyanka
 Usha Bachani as Rukmini
 Adarsh Gautam as Ashok
 Manish Khanna as Namit
 Pankaj Bhatia as Ravi
 Mahru Sheikh as Lalita
 Siraj Mustafa Khan as Naresh Singhania
 Rajlaxmi Solanki as Pooja Naresh Singhania
 Alka Kaushal as Lalita
 Dinesh Kaushik
 Ranjeev Verma
 Jayant Rawal
 Pawan Kumar as Ranjeet
 Meenakshi Verma
 Brownie Parashar
 Rakesh Pandey
 Nitika Anand as Shayra
 Pratichi Mishra as Sharda Ajit Singhania
 Mreenal Deshraj / Rinku Karmakar as Lekha
 Yash Sinha as Dharam
 Prithvi Zutshi as Inspector Ronnie D' Souza
 Ramesh Rai as Advocate Chaddha

References

External links
Pancham Official Site on Zee TV India

2004 Indian television series debuts
2005 Indian television series endings
Indian television series
Zee TV original programming